Sailing was an official part of the Summer Paralympic Games between 2000 to 2016, after being a demonstration sport in 1996. The International Association for Disabled Sailing was responsible for coordinating the event with the International Paralympic Committee and the hosts.

Paralympic Classes and Disciplines

Medal Tables

Olympic sailing venues

Statistics

Medalist

Multiple Medalists

2.4m / Norlin Mk3 Medalists

SKUD 18 Medalists

Sonar Medalists

References 
 
 

 
Sailing
Paralympics
Sailing competitions in the United States